Qingdao Hainiu may reference one of the following football clubs:
Qingdao F.C., a football club established in 2013, named Qingdao Hainiu between 2013 and 2015
Qingdao Hainiu F.C. (1990), a football club established in 1990, formerly named Qingdao Etsong Hainiu between 1997 and 2004 and was renamed Qingdao Hainiu from 2021